van Veldhoven is a Dutch toponymic surname meaning "from Veldhoven". Notable people with the surname include:

Harm van Veldhoven (born 1962), Dutch-Belgian footballer and manager
Jos van Veldhoven (born 1952), Dutch choral conductor
Stientje van Veldhoven (born 1973), Dutch politician

Dutch-language surnames
Surnames of Dutch origin